Archagathus (fl. 4th century BC) was a  Syracusan Greek Prince. He was the son of Archagathus by an unnamed wife, being a paternal grandson of the Greek tyrant (and later "king" of Sicily) Agathocles of Syracuse from his first wife. 

Archagathus was described as a youth of great bravery and daring. After the death of his father in 307 BC, Archagathus murdered his paternal uncle Agathocles, so that he would succeed his paternal grandfather. After the death of his paternal uncle, he was in turn murdered by a local Greek citizen called Maemon.

References

Sources
Ancient Library article: Archagathus, No. 1 & 2

4th-century BC Syracusans
Assassins
Assassinated Greek people